Fifteenmile Creek is a stream in the U.S. state of Georgia. It is a tributary to the Canoochee River.

References

Rivers of Georgia (U.S. state)
Rivers of Candler County, Georgia
Rivers of Emanuel County, Georgia